Hutt can refer to:

Places

New Zealand
 Hutt River (New Zealand), name after William Hutt (politician).
 Hutt Valley, an area inland from Wellington
 Hutt County, a former county in the Hutt Valley
 Lower Hutt ('Hutt City'), a territorial authority (formerly part of Hutt County)
 Upper Hutt ('Upper Hutt City'), a territorial authority (formerly part of Hutt County)
 Hutt (New Zealand electorate), a former electorate, 1983-1956
 Mount Hutt, a mountain and ski field in the Southern Aps

Australia
 Hutt River (South Australia)
 Hutt River (Western Australia)
 Hutt Lagoon, Western Australia
 Hutt Street, Adelaide, South Australia

Antarctica
 Hutt Peak, Marie Byrd Land

Other uses
 Hutt (surname)
 Hutt (Star Wars), a fictional alien species
 Hutt International Boys' School, a state integrated boys' secondary school in Upper Hutt, New Zealand
 Hutt Intermediate School, Lower Hutt,  New Zealand
 Hutt Recreation Ground, a football, cricket and rugby union ground in Lower Hutt, New Zealand

See also
 Principality of Hutt River, a self-proclaimed independent state within the borders of Western Australia